Art of Balance (stylized as art of balance) is a physics-based puzzle video game developed and published by Shin'en Multimedia. The game was originally released on WiiWare in 2010, then enhanced in high definition and ported to the Wii U's and Nintendo Switch's eShop in 2013 and 2018, respectively, and PlayStation 4's PlayStation Store in 2016. A version with touch controls was also ported to the Nintendo 3DS's eShop in 2012, titled Art of Balance TOUCH!

Gameplay
Art of Balance is a puzzle game in which the player has to stack several blocks on top of one another on a platform floating in water without the blocks falling into the water. The blocks can be rotated at 45 ° angles. The blocks can be square or round and also take on other shapes. Some blocks will break if too many more blocks are placed on it. The game features several different game modes.

In arcade mode, the player has a supply of blocks. The point is to stack the blocks on top of each other until there are none left. Then the tower must stand still for three more seconds without falling over. In this game mode there are eight worlds with a total of 200 puzzles. There are also super puzzles in which the player has a time limit or the platform sways on the water. The puzzles can also be played cooperatively with a second player.

Reception

Art of Balance has been praised for its "simple yet clever mechanics" and "serene soundtrack". It received generally favorable reviews, with Eurogamer's Kristan Reed calling it a "nothing short of essential" game.

References

External links

2010 video games
Indie video games
Multiplayer and single-player video games
Nintendo 3DS eShop games
Nintendo Switch games
PlayStation 4 games
PlayStation Network games
Puzzle video games
Video games developed in Germany
Wii U eShop games
WiiWare games